Aktedrilus is a genus of annelids belonging to the family Naididae.

The genus has cosmopolitan distribution.

Species:

Aktedrilus arcticus 
Aktedrilus argatxae 
Aktedrilus brevis

References

Annelids